Balochistan Arts Council (BAC) is an arts center and cultural exhibition center in Quetta, Pakistan. In March 2013 Baloch Culture Day was held at this venue.

References 

Arts centres in Pakistan
Baloch culture
Theatres in Pakistan
Organisations based in Quetta
Music venues in Pakistan
Arts organisations based in Pakistan